Reiner Maurer (born 16 February 1960) is a German football coach and a former player. He most recently managed Türkgücü München.

Playing career
Maurer was born in Mindelheim. He spent three seasons in the Bundesliga as a player for FC Bayern Munich, VfB Stuttgart and 1860 Munich.

Managerial career

1860 Munich
Maurer was head coach of the reserve team from July 2001 to April 2004. Maurer became interim head coach when Rudolf Bommer was sacked in December 2004. Maurer was sacked in January 2006.

Time in Greece
Maurer went to Greece and became head coach of OFI in July 2006. Maurer left by mutual consent in November 2007. Then Maurer was head coach of Kavala from June 2008 to November of the same year and Rodos in 2010 before moving back to 1860 Munich.

Return to 1860 Munich and Greece
Maurer was hired as 1860 Munich manager in June 2010 and was sacked in November 2012. Maurer returned to Greece when Skoda Xanthi hired him in September 2013. He stayed there for four months.

Thailand
From November 2015 to November 2017, Maurer managed Angthong.

Coaching record

References

Honours
 DFB-Pokal: 1983–84

External links
 
 

1960 births
Living people
German footballers
Association football defenders
Bundesliga players
2. Bundesliga players
FC Memmingen players
SpVgg Unterhaching players
FC Bayern Munich footballers
VfB Stuttgart players
Karlsruher SC players
Arminia Bielefeld players
TSV 1860 Munich players
German football managers
2. Bundesliga managers
TSV 1860 Munich managers
OFI Crete F.C. managers
Kavala F.C. managers
Xanthi F.C. managers
People from Mindelheim
Sportspeople from Swabia (Bavaria)
Footballers from Bavaria